The 2000 King Hassan II International Cup Tournament was the third edition of this international football competition. It took place in the summer of 2000, less than a week before the Euro 2000. Matches were held on 4  and 6 June 2000 in Morocco. Host nation Morocco, France (who went on to win the Euro the following month), Japan and Jamaica participated in the tournament, and all matches took place at the Stade Mohamed V, home of Moroccan clubs Raja Casablanca and Wydad Casablanca. The tournament was played in a cup format, with only four games played (two semi-finals, a final and a third-place match).

The last edition of the Hassan II Trophy tournament was won by France after beating Morocco in the final 5-1.

Participating teams
 (host)

Results

Semifinals

Third place match

Final

Awards

Statistics

Goalscorers

References

External links 
2000 King Hassan II Tournament at rsssf

2000
1999–2000 in Moroccan football
1999–2000 in French football
2000 in Japanese football
2000 in Jamaican sport